Mrákotín is a municipality and village in Chrudim District in the Pardubice Region of the Czech Republic. It has about 300 inhabitants.

Administrative parts
The village of Oflenda is an administrative part of Mrákotín.

History
The first written mention of Mrákotín is from 1456.

Gallery

References

External links

Villages in Chrudim District